Club de Deportes Santiago Morning (popularly known as Chaguito Morning or Morning) is a Chilean professional football club based in Recoleta, Santiago. They compete in the Primera B. Santiago Morning was one of Primera División de Chile founding members in 1933, being champion for the first time in 1942.

The club was founded in 1903 when Santiago established its own association of football thanks to the management of Santiago College's students on 19 October, under the name of Santiago Football Club. Three days later, the club played its first game against the teachers' team. Years later, the club was one of Primera División de Chile founder teams in 1933, being the first team on play a Chilean top-tier professional match against Audax Italiano. In 1936, the club was renamed with its current name of Santiago Morning, after the merger between Santiago Football Club and Morning Star. During the 1930s, the club was one of the most popular teams in Chile.

Santiago Morning's traditional rival is Magallanes, disputing the 'Metropolitan Derby'. The major shareholder of the club is the former footballer Miguel Nasur, since Demetrio Marinakis left the club in 2005. Among other facts, the team play his home games at Estadio Municipal de La Pintana and is part of CONMEBOL's '"Club de los 100"' (Centerary's Club) alongside other Chilean clubs like Audax Italiano, Everton, Unión Española, Fernández Vial, Magallanes and Santiago Wanderers.

History

Foundation and amateur era
In 1903, Santiago formed its own football association. This association had antecedents in the neighbors of Cousino Park (current O'Higgins Park) and some Santiago College students, led by a professor, Mister Vincent, who put on a demonstration at Mars Field, which allowed the club to begin to attract more participants. On 16 October 1903, the club was formed thanks to the management of the students the club was founded as Santiago Football Club. The team played its first match against the teacher's team, three days later on 19 October. In 1928, the club won the amateur league (Liga Central de Football).

Four years later, in 1907, Morning Star was founded, based in the Independencia neighborhood. Its uniform was a blue kit and white shorts.

In 1933, the team was one of eight that founded the Chilean Primera División and the first team in play a professional match, in 3–1 loss against Audax Italiano at Estadio Santa Laura. In its first professional season (1933), the team finished in sixth place. In 1935, the club was relegated to the Serie B, after finishing in 12th place.

The rise and fall

In March 1936, after the merger of Santiago FC and Morning Star founded Santiago Morning. The first professional game of the team was in the same year, in a 2–1 win against his rival Magallanes. In the same, the club played his first season and finished 4th of six teams, making a similar tournament in the next season.

Of six teams participants, Santiago Morning finished once in the 4th place, same place that the team achieved in 1936 and 1937. The success and the illusion were announced in the 1939 season, when that Morning achieved the second place in the positions table with notable victories to Green Cross for 7–5, to his rival Magallanes for 6–5, to Metropolitano 7–1 and a most remembered victory to Universidad Católica for 8–2, where the famous goalkeeper Sergio Livingstone played. In 1941, the club makes a similar season, but with lower goal difference.

The club win its first title in 1942, finishing in the first place of the table with 29 points over his rival Magallanes with 28 points. In the same tournament, Santiago Morning had highlighted players in his squad as Raúl Toro, best player of Morning's history and Domingo Romo goalscorer of the team and the tournament with 16 goals. In this tournament, also highlighted the victories 5–1 to Audax Italiano, to Santiago Badminton for 4–0, 5–1 to Magallanes and Unión Española, 7–3 to Santiago National and 3 goals scored to the universities.

In the tournament of 1943, Morning can't repeat the title of the last season, achieving the sixth place in the table with 17 points. In the next season, the club finish in the third place with Magallanes (both teams with 29 points) was only two points of the champion Colo-Colo, who had 31 points. After many irregular seasons, in early 1950s, the club qualified to the championship play-off.

In 1956 season the club struggled, finishing in bottom of the table (12th place) with 14 points under Ferrobadminton, being relegated to the Second Division for the first time ever. Morning remained in the second tier only three years, until 1959. The second spell in the top flight lasted 11 seasons, before another relegation in 1970.  In the 1970s, the club only played three seasons in Primera, suffering one relegation and before of the club's promotion in 1974, Morning remaining this four years. In 1981, the club gained promotion to Primera for the next season, but the club wasn't able to maintain top flight status and bounced back to the second level. In 1983, Morning struggled again and were relegated to Tercera División, and made history as the first Primera División Champion to play in the third tier of Chilean Football, by the time a semi-professional league.

The club remained as amateur, facing financial difficulties, until 1996. In 1994, the team had a golden chance for return to the professional football, but the team loss with Curicó Unido at the final, after a dramatic definition. Two years later, the club was crowned champions of Tercera División, being promoting to Primera B, thus regaining professional status.

After two seasons in Primera B, with the former footballer Jorge Aravena as coach, the club achieved promotes to the first level after 14 years of absence in this category, after of won to Provincial Osorno in the promotion play-offs.

2000s

In his re-inaugural season in 2000, the club made good performance, qualifying to the Copa Libertadores playoffs and being runner-up of the Copa Chile after of loss with Universidad de Chile in the final, also highlighted the participation of Fernando Martel, the goalscorer of the cup. In this season, the club had players as the self Martel, Francisco Arrué, Carlos Tejas and Manuel Ibarra.

In the next season, Morning nearly relegates to Primera B, but in 2002, the team were not saved from relegation, returning to the second level. In 2005, under the coach Ivo Basay and with players as Esteban Paredes and Rodrigo Goldberg, 'The Bohemians' achieved the promotion to the Chilean Primera División. In the next season, the team once relegated to the second tier. Once winning the Second Division, he returned to the First Division, where they remain until today.

In the season 2008, the bohemian team realized an unexpected season, despite defeat 8–2 to Universidad Católica in the first week of the Torneo de Apertura, the club had a very good style of play, including, this that led them to nearly qualify for the playoffs. The club made a similar season in the Torneo de Clausura, nearly qualifying for the play-offs, finishing in the third place with 26 points of his group under O'Higgins with 27 points in the second place.

In the next season, Morning qualified for first time in its history to play-offs, but the team immediately was eliminated by Católica by a global result of 8–1. For the Torneo de Clausura, the team made big signs as Reinaldo Navia, Rodolfo Ferrando and Sergio Comba. In this tournament, Morning also qualified to the play-offs, winning the first match to Audax Italiano for an aggregate result of 5–4, thanks to a 90th-minute goal of the goalkeeper Víctor Loyola, but shortly after once the team was eliminated by Católica, now in the semi-finals for an aggregate result of 8–3.

In the 2010 season, the club completed an irregular season finishing in the 16th place, being only two points of the direct relegation, in where was the team Everton. In the Promotion play-offs, the club nearly relegated to the Second Division, after of win to Antofagasta with a last minute goal of Pablo Calandria at extra-time.

Honours

League
 Primera División de Chile (first tier)
 Winners (1): 1942
 Runners-up (2): 1939, 1941
 Segunda División de Chile/Primera B (second tier)
 Winners (3): 1959, 1974, 2005
 Runners-up (3): 1957, 1958, 1981
 Tercera División de Chile (third tier)
 Winners (2): 1984, 1996
 Runners-up (1): 1994

Cup
 Copa Chile
 Runners-up (1): 2000
 Campeonato de Apertura
 Winners (4): 1934, 1944, 1949, 1950
 Campeonato de Campeones
 Winners (2): 1943, 1944

Players

Current squad

2021 Winter Transfers

In

Out

Individual honours

Primera División goalscorers
 Domingo Romo: 16, 1942
 Rubén Aguilera: 21, 1951
 Victor Pizarro: 27, 1975
 Esteban Paredes: 17, Apertura 2009
 Diego Rivarola: 13, Clausura 2009

Copa Chile goalscorers
 Fernando Martel: 8, 2000

Managers
 Pedro Cubilla
 Francisco Hormazábal (1963)
 Jorge Aravena (1998–99), (2001–02)
 Ivo Basay (2005–06)
 Orlando Aravena (2006)
 José Basualdo (2008)
 Mauricio Pozo (interim) (2009)
 Juan Antonio Pizzi (2009–10)
 Hernán Godoy (2010)
 Fernando Díaz (2010–13)
 Ricardo Lunari (2012)
 Mauricio Giganti (2013)
 Mauricio Pozo (2015)

References

External links
Santiago Morning Official Webstite

Football clubs in Chile
1903 establishments in Chile
Association football clubs established in 1903
Sport in Santiago